Gamblerz (Hangul: 갬블러 크루), formerly known as Gambler, is a South Korean b-boy crew formed in 2002. They are best known for winning first place at Battle of the Year 2004 and 2009, the R-16 Korea Sparkling in 2008 and 2014, CYON Bboy Championships 2010, and Bucheon Bboy International Championship in 2016 along with many other major competitions across the world. Many of their b-boys have competed in individual tournaments as well, such as Red Bull BC One.

The original members of Gamblerz, known in 2002 simply as Gambler, were B-boy Darkness, Music, Bruce Lee, Still, and Sebin. B-boy So (King So) and The End (KYS) were regional members.
 
According to former crew leader B-boy Darkness, when B-boy Music, the founding member of Gamblerz, left the crew on a hiatus, Darkness changed the crew name from Gambler to Gamblerz. However, after B-boy Music, along with B-boy Sebin and B-boy Laser, returned from the hiatus, Darkness, Music, Laser, and Sebin left Gamblerz to form a separate crew under the original crew name of Gambler. The present day Gamblerz is now led by B-boy Sick. In 2016, the crew ran tests to have a new member and for the first time in Korea, a foreigner was accepted. The Brazilian Victor Carvalho, now better known as Victorious.

Members

References

External links

Gamblerz Crew Official Site

Gamblerz Crew on Daum Cafe 
Gamblerz Crew on Naver Blog
Gamblerz Crew on Naver TV

Gamblerz Crew Fan (갬블리) on Kaokao Talk

South Korean breakdancing groups